Moon Sang-min (born April 14, 2000), is a South Korean actor. He gained recognition for his role as Grand Prince Seongnam in Under the Queen's Umbrella (2022).

Early life
Moon Sang-min was born on April 14, 2000, in Cheongju, North Chungcheong Province. His family consists of his parents and an elder brother. He graduated from the Fashion Model Department at Hanlim Multi Art School, and is currently attending Sungkyunkwan University.

Career
As a model, he walked his first runway at the 2018 F/W Sewing Boundaries Collection in 2018. In 2019, he made his acting debut in the web drama 4 Reasons Why I Hate Christmas.

In 2021, Moon played the role of a young detective in Netflix series My Name. Then in 2022, he starred in the tvN historical drama Under the Queen's Umbrella. His performance as Prince Seongnam led to an increased popularity and recognition for him, and reportedly more than 20 advertising deals were offered to him by various companies.

Other activities

Endorsement
On January 2, 2023, Moon Sang-min accepts cosmetics and watch models(ROMANSON)... Rising star's unstoppable move 

On February 1, 2023, Moon introduced as the new brand ambassador of the beauty care brand, I'm from.

Filmography

Television series

Web series

References

External links
Moon Sang-min at Awesome Ent

2000 births
Living people
People from Cheongju
South Korean male television actors
21st-century South Korean male actors
South Korean male web series actors
Hanlim Multi Art School alumni
Sungkyunkwan University alumni